Stora Valla is a multi-use stadium in Degerfors, Sweden. It is currently used mostly for football matches and hosts the home matches of Degerfors IF. The stadium holds 12,500 people and opened in 1938. The record attendance is 21,065 spectators, when Degerfors IF played IFK Norrköping, 1963.

References

Football venues in Sweden
Degerfors IF
Sports venues completed in 1938
1938 establishments in Sweden
Buildings and structures in Degerfors Municipality
Sport in Örebro County